The  was a Japanese clan that ruled the Sakura Domain in Shimosa Province in the late Edo period. Jindai-ji in the present-day city of Sakura was the clan's bodaiji, or family temple, and has many of the tombstones of prominent members of the Hotta clan.

References
  "Hotta-shi" on Harimaya.com (5 March 2008).

 
Japanese clans